A house party is a type of party where people gather at the residence of the party's host.

Organization
A house party might be organized several months or just a few hours in advance. News of a party may be spread by personal invitations, word of mouth, posted leaflets, or notices on social networking sites. Broad notice of a party – sometimes unintentionally – can result in large numbers of people attending who do not know the host personally, and may be disruptive. A person who attends a house party but has not been invited, is typically referred to as a "gatecrasher", particularly if the party is open only to invited guests; they are usually perceived negatively, but may nonetheless be welcomed by the host.

History
An early example of a house party can be seen in the play Mostellaria (The Haunted House) by the Roman playwright Plautus. In the play, a young man called Philolaches holds a house party with many friends while his father Theopropides is away on business.

House parties have become a prominent feature in popular movies, particularly movies aimed at teenagers. While many have probably been present before the movie, The Party  is one of the first to properly provide a scene of a house party. However, the most popular film later on is House Party featuring hip hop rap duo Kid-N-Play.

In various cultures
In the former Yugoslavia, a sijelo (In Ijekavian), silo (In Ikavian) or selo (In Ekavian) is an evening social gathering at a house. The use of the word sijelo is particularly widespread in Bosnia and Herzegovina.

In Ireland, a Céilí is a social gathering which, in its traditional form, takes place in a domestic dwelling. Contemporary céliís often involve music and dancing and can also take place in a public or private meeting space, in addition to in a domestic setting.

In the United Kingdom, house parties may be referred to as a 'Skins' party, referring to a well-known TV show focusing on the lives of teenagers who often participate in and host open house parties.

See also

Cocktail party
House Party, Inc.
House Party (radio and TV show)
Political houseparty
Šokačko sijelo, minority festival

References
House Party Decoration Ideas

Bibliography
For Sijelo:

Sexuality and society
Parties
Youth culture